Lewis Arlt is an American director, actor, and writer. He has been nominated for Daytime Emmys (Outstanding Supporting Actor in a Daytime, 1979, and Outstanding Drama Series Writing Team, 1995), and four Writers Guild of America Awards (he has won three times: 1993 (Loving), 1994 (General Hospital), and 1995).

Acting credits
Confessions of A Dangerous Mime
Fuck
Hamlet
Trinity
Law & Order
Drug Wars: The Cocaine Cartel
Orpheus Descending
The Littlest Victims
See You In The Morning
Guiding Light
Tales From The Darkside (as Michael Nelson in Payment Overdue - 1988)
Ryan's Hope
Another World (as David Thatcher from 1983-1984 & Ken Jordan from 1990–1991)
He Knows You're Alone
The Andros Targets (1977)
Search for Tomorrow

Writing credits
He has written on Loving, Ryan's Hope, General Hospital and Another World.

References

External links

http://www.tv.com/lewis-arlt/person/27688/summary.html

Living people
American soap opera writers
American male television writers
American male television actors
American male soap opera actors
Year of birth missing (living people)